The Ministry of Gender Equality and Family, or formerly the Ministry of Gender Equality (여성부, 女性部), is a cabinet-level division of the government of South Korea. It was created on February 28, 1998 as the Presidential Commission on Women's Affairs. The current ministry was formed on January 29, 2001.

History

Origins 
Since the establishment of the government of South Korea in August 1948, the Ministry of Social Issues (사회부; 社會部) handled discrimination against women until the department's merge in 1955. Afterwards, the Ministry of Social Issues merged with the Ministry of Health (보건부) to become the Ministry of Social Issues and Health (보건사회부). In 1994, the Ministry of Social Issues and Health became the Ministry of Health and Welfare (보건복지부); consequently, it began to take address discrimination against women. However, the ministries were criticized for the lack of advancement for women's social position and the lack of enforcement of its policies.

Specific policies addressing sexism began to be addressed with the establishment of the Department heading state affairs (정무장관실) on February 25, 1998 after the inauguration of President Kim Dae-jung. On February 28, 1998, the Presidential Commission on Women's Affairs (여성특별위원회) was formed. On July 23, 1999, the Law forbidding and regulating sexual discrimination (남녀차별 금지 및 구제에 관한 법률) was created. However, the criticism concerning the lack of advancement in women's social position continued, and the Ministry of Gender Equality (여성부) was formed as a response on January 29, 2001. It was transferred following responsibilities: protecting the victims of domestic violence and sexual violence; prevention of prostitution; overseeing women's occupations from the Ministry of Health and Welfare.

Developments 
On June 12, 2004, the ministry received the responsibilities of overseeing developments of infants from the Ministry of Health and Welfare. On June 23, 2005, the ministry reorganized to become the Ministry of Gender Equality and Family (여성가족부) in order for a more cohesive creation and enforcement of policies. On February 29, 2008, the ministry was changed back to the Ministry of Gender Equality while transferring the responsibilities of overseeing families and child care to the Ministry of Health and Welfare, which had become the Ministry for Health, Welfare and Family Affairs. On March 19, 2010, the Ministry was re-reorganized to become the Ministry of Gender Equality and Family while assuming back the responsibilities of overseeing teenagers, and families.

Organization

Objectives 
According to the Official Ministry of Gender Equality and Family English website, the objectives of the ministry are:
 Planning and coordination of women's policy, and improvement of women's status through the enhancement of women's rights 
 Establishment, conciliation, and support for family policy and multicultural family policy 
 Fostering welfare and protection of youth
 Prevention of violence against women, children and youth and protection of its victims

Functions 
According to the Official Ministry of Gender Equality and Family English website, the functions of the ministry are:  
 Planning and coordinating gender-related policies 
 Gender impact analysis of policies 
 Developing and utilizing women resources 
 Expanding women's participation in society 
 Preventing sex trade and protecting its victims 
 Preventing domestic and sexual violence and protecting its victims 
 Forging partnership with women's civil groups and international organizations

Sub-Organization 
The Ministry is headed by a cabinet minister, and is organized with a Vice Minister who acts as a policy adviser to the minister and a  Spokesperson. The Vice Minister controls the following divisions: the Management Supporting Division; Planning & Coordination Office; Women's Policy Bureau; Youth & Family Policy Office; Women & Youth Rights Promotion Bureau. The Spokesperson is in charge of the Public Relations Division.

Gender equality policy 
Development and Implementation of "The 2nd Framework Plan for Gender Equality Policies"

 Background
 Development of the "Basic Plan for Gender Equality Policies" every five years to realize gender equality in more practical terms by addressing the gender gap between women and men.
 Implementation Basis

Article 7 of the Framework Act on Gender Equality.

 Vision and Goal

Improvement of women's representation in the public sector

Expansion of Women's Participation in Policy-Making Process 

 Preparation of the legal ground that prevents one particular gender from exceeding 60% in the membership of a government committee (enforced as of Feb. 14, 2014).
 Establishment of the "Plan for the Expansion of Women's Participation" to achieve the 40% target in terms of women's participation in government committees by 2017 (July, 2013) and monitoring of the Plan's implementation status.
— Women's participation rates for government committees (2012-2017): 25.7% in 2012 → 27.7% in 2013 → 31.7% in 2014 → 34.5% in 2015 → 37.8% in 2016 → 40.2% in 2017
— Expansion of Female Public Officials in Public Sector.
 (Public office) Implementation of the Expansion Plan for the Employment of Level 4 or Above Female Managers (2017 target: 15%); and reflection of the Plan's implementation results in the performance evaluation of each government ministries and agencies (in cooperation with the Ministry of Personnel Management).
— rates of female public officials of Level 4 and above (2012-2017): 9.3% in 2012 → 9.9% in 2013 → 11.0% in 2014 → 12.1% in 2015 → 13.5% in 2016 → 14.8% in 2017
 (Public schools) Implementation of the 'Expansion Plan for Women Principals and Vice-Principals at public schools (2017 target: 38%); and monitoring of the Plan's implementation by local education authorities (in cooperation with the Ministry of Education).
— rates of women principals and vice-principals at public schools (2012-2017): 24.6% in 2012 → 27.2% in 2013 → 29.4% in 2014 → 34.2% in 2015 → 37.3% in 2016 → 40.6% in 2017
 (Public organizations) Establishment of the "Target System for Female Managers at Public Organizations (July 2014)" (2017 target: 18.8%) and reflection of related performance results in the 2014 state evaluation of each public organization (in cooperation with the Ministry of Economy and Finance).
— rates of female managers in public organizations (2012-2017): 11.5% in 2012 → 13.0% in 2013 → 14.8% in 2014 → 16.4% in 2015 → 17.2% in 2016 → 18.8% in 2017

Expansion of Women Leaders Pool 
 Fostering of Future Women Leaders identified as a National Policy Project in order to enhance women's representation; and Expansion of the "Women Leaders Database" up to 110,000 people.
— Women leaders registered on the database (2013-2017): 47,068 in 2013 → 63,776 in 2014 → 78,960 in 2015 → 94,110 in 2016 → 101,346 in 2017
 To utilize the database to identify women leaders with particular talent and career accomplishment so as to recommend them as a candidate for government committees and the executive board of public institutions.

Prevention of violence against women children and support for the victim

Policy Objective 
Prevention of Violence against Women·Children including Sexual Traffic, Sexual Violence or Domestic Violence and Infringement of Their Human Rights; and Construction of Protection and Support System for the Victims.

Contents of Policy 
Support for the Victim of Sexual Violence

 (Support for operation of Sunflower Center) Counseling, medical, investigational and legal support.
 (Support for operation of counseling center for the victim and protection facility) Counseling on the damage, protection of victim, provision of board and lodging, education for self-support.
 (Support of free legal service for the victim) Legal aid business such as legal representation and legal counseling service.
 (Correction treatment program for the offender of sexual violence) Prevention of recurrence through correcting the behavior of the offender.
 (Regional solidarity for safety of children and women) Construction of regional safety net for private-public cooperation and exchange of resource and information.

Support for Victim of Sexual Traffic 
 (Purpose of support) Prevention of reentering to sex trade and promotion to returning to society by supporting the victim of sexual traffic.
 (Support facilities) ▶(counseling center for the victim of sex trade) professional counseling, medical treatment, legal aids, liaison with related authorities, outreach, business at sex trade brothel ▶(support facility for people·juveniles) provision of board and lodging, medical treatment, legal aids, operation of treatment and recovery, vocational training and job placement ▶(support facility for foreigners) emergency protection, provision of interpretation service, medical treatment, legal aids, liaison with related authorities including embassy, support for returning to mother country. ▶(self-reliance support center) support for employment and foundation, provision of job at common workplace, construction of network to use outside resources, aftercare service for the employment or foundation ▶(alternative education facility) support for compulsory education, self-support education, and training to develop social adaptability ▶(cohabitation facility to support self-reliance) support for temporary dwelling for the women escaped from prostitution.

Support for Domestic Violence Victims 
 (Operation of Women Emergency Call 1366) Emergency counseling, aids and liaison with related authorities for the victims of domestic violence, sexual violence or sexual trafficking.
 (Support operation of counseling center for domestic violence victims and protection facility) Counseling on the effects of violence, protection for the victims, provision of board and lodging, damage recovery program, and education for self-support.
 (Support free legal services for the victims) Legal aid business such as legal representation and legal counseling service.
 (Treatment and protection for the victims) Diagnosis on physical and psychological injury caused by domestic violence and support for medical expenses.
 (Housing support for female victims) Provision of rental house for the victims and their family.

Education to Prevent Violence 
 (Purpose) Monitoring and inspection on the implementation records of preventive education in public organizations to diffuse social awareness to prevent violence;development of various contents;and support for the preventive education through the training of professional teachers.
 (Target) Governmental organizations, local governments, public organizations, childcare facility, kindergarten
 (Number of time) Over one hour per year per each violence type (sexual harassment, sexual traffic, sexual violence, domestic violence).
 (Education method) Implementation with various methods of collective education by professional teacher, collective education using audio-visual materials, cyber lecture.

Disclosure of personal information of a sex Offender 
Disclosure and Notification of Personal Information of Convicted Sex Offenders (via Mail and Mobile Application).

What is "Disclosure and Notification of Personal Information of Convicted Sex Offenders (via Mail and Mobile Application)" system?

 A system to disclose personal information of a sex offender in concurrence with a judgment on a sex offence case against a child or juvenile at the website (Sex Offender Notice) and provide the information to the child · youth protection households and schools at the region (Eup, Myun, Dong) where the sex offender resides

Relevant Act.

 Article 49~52 of the Act on the Protection of Children and Juveniles from Sexual Abuse
 Enforcement Decree and Enforcement Regulation on the Act on the Protection of Children and Juveniles from Sexual Abuse.

Target for the Disclosure and Notification.
 A person against whom an order to notify personal information is sentenced from those who committed sexual violence

Registered Information for Disclosure and the Notification Information 
 Registered information for disclosure: Name, age, address and actual place of residence (up to road name and building numbers), body size (height and weight), photograph (front, left side, right side, whole body), summary of a sex offence (including date of judgment, name of the offence, pronounced sentence), previous criminal record of sexual assault, and existence of an electronic device.
 Notification information: The same as that of the registered information for disclosure, but the address and actual place of residence includes detailed information.

Execution of Disclosure or Notification Order.
 To be executed by the Minister of Gender Equality and Family in accordance with the order of court

Way to Access the Disclosed and Notified Information.
 Disclosed information is available at the exclusive Sex Offender Notice website (www.sexoffender.go.kr) and mobile (m.sexoffender.go.kr).
 The information for notification is sent by mail and also available at "information network" menu at the exclusive website.

Restrictions on Employment of a Sex Offender 
Purpose of Restriction on Employment.
 To prevent and protect a child or a juvenile from sexual crime by restricting the employment of a sex offender at child or juvenile-related institution for a certain period of time.

Relevant Act
 Article 56~58, 60 and 67 of the Act on the Protection of Children and Juveniles from Sexual Abuse.

Contents of Restrictions on Employment.
 No one sentenced to a penalty or medical treatment and custody for committing a sex offense against a child, juvenile, or adult and for whom such sentence is made final and conclusive shall operate child or juvenile-related educational institution or work for or provide actual labor to a child or juvenile-related institution. For the maximum ten years from the date on which the execution of such penalty or medical treatment and custody is terminated, or suspended or exempted. When the court adjudicates on the case, period of restriction on employment of a sex offender will be sentenced.
— Applicable to a sex offender against an adult: One who received final sentence for firstly committing a sex offence against an adult after April 15, 2010.

List of Facilities or Institutions Restricting Employment 
 Kindergartens, schools, private teaching institutes, teaching schools, and private tutors,
 Day care centers and child welfare facilities.
 Sports facilities.
 Juvenile activity facilities, juvenile protection and rehabilitation centers, juvenile shelters, and youth counseling and welfare centers.
 Juvenile support facilities and sex trafficking victim counseling centers under the Act on the Prevention of Sex Traffic and Protection of Victims.
 Housing management offices of collective housing (applicable only to those performing security guard duties)
 Medical institutions (medical personnel) and teachers of home-study materials (applicable from August 2, 2012).
 Corporations providing security services (applicable only to those performing security guard duties), providers of computer Internet game facility (PC room), providers of multiple game room (multi-room), providers of juvenile games (electronic game room), Karaoke rooms having rooms for juveniles, business establishments for popular culture and arts planning, and business establishments for planning juvenile activities (applicable from June 19, 2013).

Verification Procedure for the Sex Offence History 
 (The head of a local government, the superintendent of an education office or the head of a district office of education having jurisdiction over the establishment of, authorization for, or reporting on the establishment of a child or juvenile-related institutions) Inquire of the police station (criminal department) about the sex offence history of a person who intends to run a child or juvenile-related institutions upon the request by the person.
 (The head of a child or juvenile-related institution) To prepare an application for verification of sex offence history after obtaining consent from the employee (or the prospective employee) and to apply for verification by visiting a police station (criminal department) or to make online request at the Criminal Records Information Management System (http://crims.police.go.kr).

Punishment against the Violation of the Acts 
 The head of a child or juvenile-related institution that fails in the verification of the sex offense history of an employee shall be punished by a fine not exceeding five million won.
 The head of a child or juvenile-related institution that refuses a request for dismissal without justifiable ground shall be punished by a fine not exceeding ten million won

Controversy and criticism 
MOGEF has been historically criticized for the involvement of the word Women (여성) in its name, which had led to charges of taking a side in the issue of gender inequality and reverse discrimination. The ministry has been involved in several controversies, which has led to a movement calling for its abolishment in 2006, 2008, 2013, and 2021.

In 2006, the MOGEF established a policy to pay men not to hire prostitutes on men's New Year's Day parties. Men were told to sign up on the website with their national identification number, and the total budget was 3,600,000 Won (3,175 US Dollars). This led to a signing movement to abolish the ministry.

In November 2011, the ministry enforced a System of forced shutdown of teenage gaming (청소년 게임 강제 셧다운제도), which has been involved in heavy controversy. The law has been criticized as being ineffective, encouraging teenagers to commit the crime of using their parents' resident registration number, and restricting the production of domestic games. The law was abolished in August 2021.

References

Notes

External links

 Ministry of Gender Equality and Family (Korean)
 Ministry of Gender Equality and Family (English)
http://www.mogef.go.kr/eng/pc/eng_pc_f001.do

South Korean women
Gender equality
South Korea, Gender equality
South Korea
South Korea
South Korea
Women in South Korea